Oxyrhynchus (ancient Egyptian Pr-Medjed) is a city in Middle Egypt located about 160 km south-southwest of Cairo in Minya Governorate. It is also an archaeological site, considered one of the most important ever discovered. Since the late 19th century, the area around Oxyrhynchus has been excavated almost continually, yielding an enormous collection of papyrus texts dating from the Ptolemaic Kingdom and Roman Egypt. They also include a few vellum manuscripts, and more recent Arabic manuscripts on paper (for example, the medieval P. Oxy. VI 1006)

History

Ancient Egyptian Era

Oxyrhynchus lies west of the main course of the Nile on the Bahr Yussef, a branch that terminates in Lake Moeris and the Faiyum oasis. In ancient Egyptian times, there was a city on the site called Per-Medjed, named after the medjed, a species of elephantfish of the Nile worshipped there as the fish that ate the penis of Osiris. It was the capital of the 19th Upper Egyptian Nome.

Ptolemaic Era

After the conquest of Egypt by Alexander the Great in 332 BC, the city was reestablished as a Hellenistic town called Oxyrrhynchoupolis.
In the Hellenistic period, Oxyrhynchus was a prosperous regional capital, the third-largest city in Egypt. After Egypt was Christianized, it became famous for its many churches and monasteries.

Roman Era
Oxyrhynchus remained a prominent, though gradually declining, town in the Roman and Byzantine periods. From 619 to 629, during the brief period of Sasanian Egypt, three Greek papyri from Oxyrhynchus include references to large sums of gold that were to be sent to the emperor.

Arab Era

During the era of Rashidun Caliphate, the town of Oxyrhinchus was invaded and conquered by Rashidun army under the leadership of Khalid ibn al-Walid. At first, the Rashidun sent emissary of Al-Mughira to negotiate with the garrison commander of the city named Batlus, however, as the negotiation ended badly, the Rashidun forces then sent their troops to attack Bahnasa.

At that point, the town's name was changed to Al-Bahnasa. The town subsequently contained a cemetery of 5,000 companions of the Islamic prophet Muhammad who had participated in the conquest of Oxyrhynchus.
After the Muslim conquest of Egypt in 641, the canal system on which the town depended fell into disrepair, and Oxyrhynchus was abandoned. Today the town of el Bahnasa occupies part of the ancient site. The Arabs called the city as "Al-Baqi' of Egypt", as Bahnasa were known for having 5,000 Sahaba buried in it. The large numbers of fallen Muslim soldiers buried in this city due to major battles against the Roman army and their fortifications in this area. It is recorded by various early Islam chroniclers, such as Al-Waqidi in his F̣utūh al-Bahnasā, and Muhammad ibn Muhammad al-Mu"izz in The Conquest of Bahnasa that the Muslim armies under Khalid ibn al-Walid  entered Bahnasa in 639, besieging the town for months before they can subdue the 50,000 Byzantine and Beja Sudanese garrison defenders.

Before it was renamed as "al-Bahnasa", Oxyrynchus were renamed as "Al-Qays town", by Maqrizi or "town of Martyrs" in honor to one of the Muslim commander that participated in the conquest of Oxyrynchus. Ali Pasha Mubarak mentioned it in the compromise plans that it was a city that had great fame and its flat was about 1000 acres and the golden curtains were working and the length of the curtains was 30 cubits and its territory included 120 villages other than the plantations and the hamlets. The northern is Kandous, the western is the mountain, the tribal is Touma, and the eastern is the sea. Each gate had three towers, and there were forty ribats, palaces, and many mosques, and at its western end there is a famous place known as the "Dome of Seven maidens".

Among the most notable tombs were allegedly belong to the Muslim martyrs were the tombs of the children of Aqil bin Ali bin Abi Talib (brother of Ali, fourth Rashidun Caliph), Ziyad bin Abi Sufyan bin Abdul Muttalib (son of Abu Sufyan ibn Harb), Aban ibn Uthman bin Affan, Muhammad ibn Abi Abd al-Rahman bin Abi Bakr al-Siddiq (grandson of Abu Bakar), and Hassan al-Salih ibn Zayn al-Abidin bin al-Hussein (great grandson of Ali).

Ibn Taghribirdi, a Mamluk era historian, also writing the history of Bahnasa conquest in his book, Al Duhur fi madaa al 'Ayaam wa al shuhur

The Muslims army settled in the town for three years as their base after the conquest, while launching occasional raids on the black and the coasts. Al-Qa`qa` bin Amr, Hashem, Abu Ayyub al-Ansari and Uqba ibn Nafi Al-Fihri, the future conqueror of Maghreb, and went with two thousand of Persians convert who now fight under the caliphate, and raided the border of Barqa.

Modern era
Today, there is the mosque of Al-Hassan bin Saleh bin Ali Zain Al-Abidin bin Al-Hussein bin Ali bin Abi Talib which allegedly built in honor for the venerated Muslim that also participated in the conquest of Bahnasa. and it is the only mosque in Egypt that has two qiblas.

Aside from Al-Hassan mosque, there are other structures erected by locals which still stand to 20th century in honor of the Muslim conqueror personalities which regarded as heroes by the locals, such as Sidi Fath al-Bab tomb, and the Sidi Ali al-Jamam mosque. according to the local imam, Dr. Abdel Halim Mahmoud, the locals of Bahnasa were very proud that their town contained so many landmarks of early Muslim heroes, which including 600 person that participated in the battles of Islam since the time of Muhammad.

Salama Zahran, director of al-Bahnasa district excavation research team, says that The region was in the ranks of second-class cities after Alexandria, the capital of Egypt at that time, which is indicated by the domes on the land of Bahnasa, which are attributed to the martyrs of the companions such as Muhammad bin Uqbah bin Amer Al-Juhani, and Ubadah bin Al-Samit.

There was also a particular mosque called dome of seven maidens, which allegedly was built to honor seven Oxyrhynchus coptic girls who defected and helped the Muslim armies under 'Amr ibn al-As and now venerated for their effort in the conquest of the city. As the town of al-Bahnasa now contained thousands historical structures in memoir of the conquests, including the 5,000 graves of companions of the prophet and Tabi'un martyrs of the battle of Bahnasa, the town are regarded by locals as "al-Baqi' of Egypt", which became the point of interest for many foreign tourists particularly from the Muslim majority country.

Archaeological excavation

In 1882, Egypt, while still nominally part of the Ottoman Empire, came under effective British rule, and British archaeologists began the systematic exploration of the country. Because Oxyrhynchus was not considered an Ancient Egyptian site of any importance, it was neglected until 1896, when two young excavators, Bernard Pyne Grenfell and Arthur Surridge Hunt, both fellows of The Queen's College, Oxford, began to excavate it. "My first impressions on examining the site were not very favourable," wrote Grenfell. "The rubbish mounds were nothing but rubbish mounds." However, they very soon realized what they had found. The unique combination of climate and circumstance had left at Oxyrhynchus an unequalled archive of the ancient world. "The flow of papyri soon became a torrent," Grenfell recalled. "Merely turning up the soil with one's boot would frequently disclose a layer."

The classical author who has most benefited from the finds at Oxyrhynchus is the Athenian playwright Menander (342–291 BC), whose comedies were very popular in Hellenistic times and whose works are frequently found in papyrus fragments. Menander's plays found in fragments at Oxyrhynchus include Misoumenos, Dis Exapaton, Epitrepontes, Karchedonios, Dyskolos and Kolax. The works found at Oxyrhynchus have greatly raised Menander's status among classicists and scholars of Greek theatre.

There is an on-line table of contents briefly listing the type of contents of each papyrus or fragment.

Since the 1930s, work on the papyri has continued. For many years it was under the supervision of Professor Peter Parsons of Oxford. Eighty large volumes of the Oxyrhynchus Papyri have been published,

Since the days of Grenfell and Hunt, the focus of attention at Oxyrhynchus has shifted. Modern archaeologists are interested in learning about the social, economic, and political life of the ancient world. This shift in emphasis had made Oxyrhynchus, if anything, even more important, for the very ordinariness of most of its preserved documents makes them most valuable for modern scholars of social history. Many works on Egyptian and Roman social and economic history and on the history of Christianity rely heavily on documents from Oxyrhynchus.

A joint project with Brigham Young University using multi-spectral imaging technology has been extremely successful in recovering previously illegible writing. With multi-spectral imaging, many pictures of the illegible papyrus are taken using different filters, finely tuned to capture certain wavelengths of light. Thus, researchers can find the optimum spectral portion for distinguishing ink from paper in order to display otherwise completely illegible papyri. The amount of text potentially to be deciphered by this technique is huge. A selection of the images obtained during the project and more information on the latest discoveries has been provided on the project's website.

On June 21, 2005, the Times Literary Supplement published the text and translation of a newly reconstructed poem by Sappho, together with discussion by Martin L. West. Part of this poem was first published in 1922 from an Oxyrhynchus papyrus, no. 1787 (fragment 1). Most of the rest of the poem has now been found on a papyrus kept at Cologne University.

In May 2020, an Egyptian-Spanish archaeological mission headed by Esther Pons and Maite Mascort revealed a unique cemetery consisting of one room built with glazed limestone dating back to the 26th Dynasty (so-called the El-Sawi era). Archaeologists also uncovered bronze coins, clay seals, Roman tombstones and small crosses.

In February 2023, 16 individual tombs and 6 funerary complex from the Persian, Roman and Coptic periods and 2 deposited frogs were discovered by the Egyptian-Spanish archaeological mission. Majority of the bodies preserved with decorated shrouds were revealed alongside the pottery vessels and lamps.

Archaeological structures of Muslim conquest 
The Ministry of Tourism and Antiquities expressed their interest in a project to restore the tombs of the Al-Bahnasa, an ancient city, in which many papyri dating back to the Greco-Roman era were found, as well as a number of tombs for the companions of Muhammad. In 2021, Egypt's head of Islamic, Coptic, Jewish antiquities sector followed up on the progress of the restoration.

In March 2020, archeological researchers from the Antiquities Inspection of Al-Bahnasa District located archaeological evidence of the encampment of Khalid ibn al-Walid and 10,000 soldiers under him, including 70 veterans of the Battle of Badr. The excavators said the Muslim armies' encampments were located in the current location of the village of Beni Hilal, Minya District, west of Bahnasa.

See also
Hellanicus of Lesbos
Heracles Papyrus
Oxyrhynchus Gospels
Oxyrhynchus hymn
Villa of the Papyri
 The Trackers of Oxyrhynchus

References

Further reading
The Oxyrhynchus Logia and the Apocryphal Gospels. (2007). Gardners Books.

External links

 Official website of the Archaeological Mission in Oxyrhynchus
Oxyrhynchus Online
PBS NOVA scienceNOW feature on papyrus imaging (streaming video)
Report on the recent Egyptian-Spanish archaeological mission to the site
Oxford University Classics Department Oxyrhynchus Project
Oxyrhynchus and the Gospel of Thomas
Article on new discoveries in the papyri from The Independent on Sunday, April 17, 2005
University of Michigan Collection
Joint Egyptian/Spanish archaeological mission in Oxyrhynchus

Oxyrhynchus papyri volumes 
The Oxyrhynchus papyri vol. I, edited with translations and notes by Bernard P. Grenfell and Arthur S. Hunt at the Internet Archive
The Oxyrhynchus papyri vol. II, edited with translations and notes by Bernard P. Grenfell and Arthur S. Hunt at the Internet Archive
The Oxyrhynchus papyri vol. III, edited with translations and notes by Bernard P. Grenfell and Arthur S. Hunt at the Internet Archive.
The Oxyrhynchus papyri vol. IV, edited with translations and notes by Bernard P. Grenfell and Arthur S. Hunt at the Internet Archive
The Oxyrhynchus papyri vol. V, edited with translations and notes by Bernard P. Grenfell and Arthur S. Hunt at the Internet Archive
The Oxyrhynchus papyri vol. VI, edited with translations and notes by Bernard P. Grenfell and Arthur S. Hunt at the Internet Archive
The Oxyrhynchus papyri vol. VII, edited with translations and notes by Arthur S. Hunt at the Internet Archive
The Oxyrhynchus papyri vol. VIII, edited with translations and notes by Arthur S. Hunt at the Internet Archive
The Oxyrhynchus papyri vol. IX, edited with translations and notes by Arthur S. Hunt at the Internet Archive
The Oxyrhynchus papyri vol. X, edited with translations and notes by Bernard P. Grenfell and Arthur S. Hunt Cornell University Library Historical Monographs Collection. Reprinted by Cornell University Library Digital Collections
The Oxyrhynchus papyri vol. X, edited with translations and notes by Bernard P. Grenfell and Arthur S. Hunt at the Internet Archive
The Oxyrhynchus papyri vol. XI, edited with translations and notes by Bernard P. Grenfell and Arthur S. Hunt at the Internet Archive
The Oxyrhynchus papyri vol. XII, edited with translations and notes by Bernard P. Grenfell and Arthur S. Hunt at the Internet Archive
The Oxyrhynchus papyri vol. XIII, edited with translations and notes by Bernard P. Grenfell and Arthur S. Hunt at the Internet Archive
The Oxyrhynchus papyri vol. XIV, edited with translations and notes by Bernard P. Grenfell and Arthur S. Hunt at the Internet Archive
The Oxyrhynchus papyri vol. XV, edited with translations and notes by Bernard P. Grenfell and Arthur S. Hunt at the Internet Archive

Populated places in Minya Governorate
 
Ancient Greek archaeological sites in Egypt
Roman sites in Egypt
Papyrology
Archaeological sites in Egypt
Former populated places in Egypt